Lisa Weiß (born 29 October 1987) is a German footballer who plays as a goalkeeper for VfL Wolfsburg and the German national team.

International career
Weiß made her senior international debut for Germany on 17 February 2010, as a 17th minute substitute for the injured Nadine Angerer in a 3–0 friendly victory over North Korea.

Honours

FCR 2001 Duisburg
Bundesliga: Runner-up 2006–07
German Cup: Runner-up 2006–07

Germany
UEFA Women's Championship: Winner 2009

References

External links

 
 
 
 National team record at dfb.de 
 

1987 births
Living people
German women's footballers
FCR 2001 Duisburg players
SGS Essen players
Germany women's international footballers
German expatriate sportspeople in France
Expatriate women's footballers in France
Women's association football goalkeepers
Footballers from Düsseldorf
UEFA Women's Championship-winning players
Olympique Lyonnais Féminin players
Division 1 Féminine players
Frauen-Bundesliga players
Women's Super League players
Aston Villa W.F.C. players
German expatriate sportspeople in England
Expatriate women's footballers in England
VfL Wolfsburg (women) players
UEFA Women's Euro 2017 players